Christian Solorio is an American politician and former member of the Arizona House of Representatives from the 30th district. He was appointed to the position on October 28, 2021, succeeding Raquel Terán, and defeated for reelection in 2022. Solorio was previously a member of the Alhambra Elementary School District Governing Board.

References 

Living people
Arizona Democrats
Year of birth missing (living people)

External links

 Campaign website